Multrees Walk is a pedestrian shopping area off the east side of St. Andrew Square, Edinburgh, Scotland. Created in 2003 as part of a redevelopment, it links St Andrew Square and St James Shopping Centre and its shops sell luxury goods including clothing, stationery and handbags.

Harvey Nichols, the department store, is the anchor of the development and has its main entrance on St. Andrew Square, but there is a smaller entrance on Multrees Walk.

Multrees Walk, Harvey Nichols and Edinburgh Bus Station (which sits below 'Multrees Walk' and is accessed by escalators from St Andrew Square or from Elder Street) was designed by Edinburgh architects CDA.

Stores in Multrees Walk

The shopping development features a number of brands from across the globe, many of which have located their only Scottish store within the walk. These brands include:

Harvey Nichols
Louis Vuitton
Burberry
Michael Kors
Nespresso
Tommy Hilfiger
Sandro

Other international brands within the development include:

Mulberry
Kurt Geiger
Pandora
Hugo Boss
Reiss
Caffe Nero
Swarovski
Tesla
Boots
Links of London

National and independent stores/cafés within the walk include:

Bravissimo/Pepperberry
JoJo Maman Bébé
Castle Fine Art
North America Travel Service
The Pen Shop

Further reading

See also
Leading shopping districts by city

References

Shopping streets in Scotland
Tourist attractions in Edinburgh
Streets in Edinburgh
New Town, Edinburgh